The Puwaq Hanka mountain range Quechua puwaq, eight, hanka snowcapped peak or ridge, "eight peaks (or ridges)", Hispanicized spelling Puagjanca, also Puagjancha) is in the Andes of Peru.

Mountains 

References

Mountain ranges of Peru
Mountain ranges of Junín Region
Mountain ranges of Lima Region